The 1990 All-Ireland Senior Camogie Championship Final was the 59th All-Ireland Final and the deciding match of the 1990 All-Ireland Senior Camogie Championship, an inter-county camogie tournament for the top teams in Ireland.

Wexford's Siobhán Dunne scored the first point, but thereafter it was all Kilkenny. The Downey sisters got 1-9 between them.

References

All-Ireland Senior Camogie Championship Finals
All-Ireland Senior Camogie Championship Final
All-Ireland Senior Camogie Championship Final
All-Ireland Senior Camogie Championship Final, 1990